The 1930 Arkansas gubernatorial election was held on November 4, 1930, to elect the Governor of Arkansas, concurrently with the election to Arkansas's Class II U.S. Senate seat, as well as other elections to the United States Senate in other states and elections to the United States House of Representatives and various state and local elections.

Incumbent Democratic Governor Harvey Parnell had won office in 1928, and was seeking reelection in 1930. During this period, it was customary for faithful governors to be reelected to a second term in Arkansas. In the Solid South, winning the Democratic primary was tantamount to election, a trend that resulted in Democratic control of the Arkansas Governor's Mansion from 1874 to 1967. Parnell won a seven-candidate primary, and was nominated by the party. The Republicans nominated James Livesay, a lawyer from Foreman in Little River County.

Parnell defeated Livesay in a landslide election, but would see his popularity decline sharply in the next two years, as the Dust Bowl and Great Depression damaged the Arkansas economy. Parnell's popular progressive programs from his first term would come under fire in his second term, with many claiming his highway modernization program and school reforms were bankrupting the state.

Democratic primary

Results

Republicans
Republicans did not hold primaries in Arkansas until the 1960s, instead nominating their candidates at the state convention. James Livesay, a lawyer and judge from Foreman, was nominated as the Republican gubernatorial candidate.

Third parties

General election

Results

References

 
 
 

Arkansas
Gubernatorial
1930
November 1930 events